Lake Region High School is a public high school located in Eagle Lake, Florida. It is operated by Polk County Public Schools, the countywide public school district.

Lake Region High School (LRHS) opened August 14, 1995.  Current enrollment is nearly 2000, with the senior class enrollment just over 300. LRHS serves the communities of Eagle Lake, South Winter Haven, North Bartow. The school is accredited by the Southern Association of Colleges and Schools, and the State of Florida Department of Education.

LRHS shares some of its main campus layouts with George Jenkins High School in Lakeland, Florida. There are some newer facility enhancements that set the school apart. Perhaps the most noticeable is the stable for the school's equine mascot, Thunder (a white Spanish-Arabian horse). The school also has a separate freshman academy that was completed in 2010.

Academies
Lake Region High School also houses several academies. These programs operate similar to a "School Within a School" with several different study tracks available. Programs that students may follow include:
 Academy of Law, Justice, & Governance
 Culinary Arts Academy
 Engineering Technology Academy
 TLC Academy (Teaching and Learning about Children)
 Thunder Threads Academy
 iMAG Technology, Marketing, and Graphic Design Academy
 Lake Region Medical Academy
 Drama Academy
 Band Academy

Notable alumni
Lamar Myles, Professional football played for the Jacksonville Jaguars NFL graduated from Louisville
 Nina Ansaroff, professional Mixed Martial Artist, current UFC Strawweight
 Derek Cassidy, American football player
 Marcus Capers, Professional basketball player
 Robert Coello, Current MLB pitcher for the Los Angeles Angels of Anaheim (Formerly with the Boston Red Sox and Toronto Blue Jays)
 Deon Rexroat, Guitarist of the band Anberlin

References

External links 
 Official school website

Great school

High schools in Polk County, Florida
Public high schools in Florida
1995 establishments in Florida
Educational institutions established in 1995